Margaret Ann Mollo (née Farquharson) (born 1933) is a British set decorator, fashion model and garden designer. She was nominated for an Academy Award in the category Best Art Direction for the film The French Lieutenant's Woman.

Selected filmography
 The French Lieutenant's Woman (1981)

References

External links

1933 births
Living people
British set decorators
Place of birth missing (living people)